The Methodist Church in Brazil was founded by American missionaries in 1867 after an initial unsuccessful founding in 1835. It has grown steadily since, becoming autonomous in 1930. In the 1970s it ordained its first woman minister. In 2006, it had 162,000 members and 1266 pastors. Also in that year, it decided to withdraw from the National Council of Churches (CONIC)

References

External links 
 

Methodist denominations
Methodism in Brazil